Lenka Dürr (born 10 December 1990 in Memmingen) is a former German volleyball player, who played as a libero. She was a member of the Women's National Team. 
She participated at the 2017 FIVB Volleyball World Grand Prix, and the 2018 FIVB Volleyball Women's Nations League.

Clubs
  FTSV Straubing (2005–2006)
  Rote Raben Vilsbiburg (2006–2013)
  Igtisadchi Baku (2013–2014)
  Azeryol Baku (2014–2015)
  Impel Wrocław (2015–2016)
 Schweriner SC (2016–2017)
 CSM Târgoviște (2017–2018)
 Rote Raben Vilsbiburg (2018–2019)
 Dresdner SC (2019–2021)

Awards

Individuals
 2014 Montreux Volley Masters "Best Libero"
 2017 Montreux Volley Masters "Best Libero"

References

External links
 Lenka Dürr at the International Volleyball Federation
 
 

1990 births
Living people
German women's volleyball players
German expatriate sportspeople in Romania
Expatriate volleyball players in Romania
German expatriate sportspeople in Azerbaijan
Place of birth missing (living people)
Expatriate volleyball players in Azerbaijan
Igtisadchi Baku volleyball players
European Games competitors for Germany
Volleyball players at the 2015 European Games
People from Memmingen
Sportspeople from Swabia (Bavaria)
Expatriate volleyball players in Poland
German expatriate sportspeople in Poland